Kitchel is an unincorporated community in Harrison Township, Union County, in the U.S. state of Indiana.

History
A post office was established at Kitchel in 1901, and remained in operation until it was discontinued in 1951.

Geography

References

Unincorporated communities in Union County, Indiana
Unincorporated communities in Indiana